"The Stars (Are Out Tonight)" is a song by English musician David Bowie; it serves as the second single from his twenty-fourth studio album The Next Day. The song's official music video was released on 25 February 2013 and the song itself was released for digital download the following day. In the UK it joined BBC Radio 2's Playlist in the B list in March 2013, "The Next Day" was also the album of the week beginning 11 March, the week in which it was released. The song was released with "Where Are We Now?" – the album's first single – on a limited edition 7" 45 vinyl record on 20 April 2013 in celebration of Record Store Day. In December 2013 the song was nominated for a 2014 Grammy Award in the category 'Best Rock Performance'.

The single's artwork is an image of painter Egon Schiele, created by Al Farrow in 1990.

Composition and reception
According to Rolling Stones Eric B. Danton, "the song starts with a slow, heavy backbeat and guttural guitar that dissolve into a propulsive bassline topped with shards of guitar and atmospheric synthesizers, for an effect reminiscent of vintage Bowie."

Andrew Trendell of Gigwise described the song as a "fierce but vibrant classic Bowie rocker in the vein of material from the brilliant ‘Scary Monsters (And Super Creeps)’," while Billboard critic Eric B. Danton interpreted it as "a return to alternative rock for Bowie."

Music video 
The official music video for the song premiered on 25 February 2013, and was made by Italian-Canadian director Floria Sigismondi. It stars Bowie and English actress Tilda Swinton as his wife. Andreja Pejić and Saskia de Brauw appear as two celebrities who disrupt the couple's lives. The Norwegian model Iselin Steiro plays the young Bowie.

Charts

Personnel
According to Chris O'Leary:

David Bowie – lead and backing vocal, 12-string acoustic guitar
Gail Ann Dorsey – bass, backing vocal
Gerry Leonard – lead guitar
David Torn – guitar
Zachary Alford – drums
Steve Elson – baritone saxophone, contrabass clarinet
Tony Visconti – recorder
Antoine Silverman – violin
Maxim Boston – violin
Hiroko Taguchi – viola
Anja Wood – cello
Janice Pendarvis – backing vocal

Technical
David Bowie – producer
Tony Visconti – producer, engineer
Mario J. McNulty – engineer

References

Sources

External links 
 

2013 singles
David Bowie songs
Music videos directed by Floria Sigismondi
2013 songs
Songs written by David Bowie
Columbia Records singles
Song recordings produced by Tony Visconti
British alternative rock songs